It Serve You Right to Suffer (later retitled It Serves You Right To Suffer on some reissues) is an album by blues singer, songwriter, and guitarist John Lee Hooker, released on the Impulse Records label in early 1966 (catalogue no. 9103). It was part of the short-lived Impulse folk music division, with the slogan adapted from their jazz promotion, "the new wave of folk is on Impulse!"

Signed to Impulse's parent label ABC Records, it is the only album Hooker made for the jazz label. Producer Bob Thiele partnered Hooker with session musicians all possessing jazz pedigree, presenting a unique setting for his music. The released songs are a mix of new compositions and re-working of ones Hooker had previously recorded, and includes a cover of the Barrett Strong 1959 Motown hit "Money (That's What I Want)."

The album was reissued for compact disc by MCA Records  on July 27, 1999.

Track listing
All songs by John Lee Hooker except "Money" by Berry Gordy and Janie Bradford.

Side one
 "Shake It Baby" – 4:23
 "Country Boy" – 5:42
 "Bottle Up & Go" – 2:27
 "You're Wrong" – 4:22

Side two
 "Sugar Mama" – 3:15
 "Decoration Day" – 5:11
 "Money" – 2:26
 "It Serves You Right to Suffer" – 5:15

Personnel
 John Lee Hooker - vocals, guitar
 Barry Galbraith - guitar
 Milt Hinton - bass
 Panama Francis - drums
 William Wells - trombone on "Money"

References

Impulse! Records albums
John Lee Hooker albums
1966 albums
Albums produced by Bob Thiele